The Landowner's Daughter is a 1953 Brazilian drama film directed by Tom Payne and Oswaldo Sampaio. It was entered into the 4th Berlin International Film Festival. It is based on the novel by Brazilian author Maria Camila Dezonne Pacheco Fernandes.

Cast
 Anselmo Duarte as Rodrigo
 Eliane Lage as Sinhá Moça
 Ruth de Souza as Sabina
 Ricardo Campos as Benedito

References

External links

1953 films
1950s Portuguese-language films
1953 drama films
Films directed by Tom Payne
Brazilian black-and-white films
Brazilian drama films